Apšupe Station was a railway station on the Tukums II – Jelgava Railway.

References 

Railway stations in Latvia
Dobele Municipality
Semigallia